USCGC Edgar Culbertson (WPC-1137) is the United States Coast Guard's 37th  cutter, and the second of three to be homeported in Galveston, Texas.

Design

Like her sister ships, Edgar Culbertson is designed to perform search and rescue missions, port security, and the interception of smugglers.  She is armed with a remotely-controlled, gyro-stabilized 25 mm autocannon, four crew served M2 Browning machine guns, and light arms. She is equipped with a stern launching ramp, that allows her to launch or retrieve a water-jet propelled high-speed auxiliary boat, without first coming to a stop.  Her high-speed boat has over-the-horizon capability, and is useful for inspecting other vessels, and deploying boarding parties.

The crew's drinking water needs are met through a desalination unit.  The crew mess is equipped with a television with satellite reception.

Operational career

Edgar Culbertson was delivered to the Coast Guard, for her acceptance trials, in Key West, on February 6, 2020. She arrived at her homeport of Galveston, Texas on March 23, 2020. Edgar Culbertson was commissioned in Galveston on June 11, 2020.

Namesake

In 2010, Charles "Skip" W. Bowen, who was then the United States Coast Guard's most senior non-commissioned officer, proposed that all 58 cutters in the Sentinel class should be named after enlisted sailors in the Coast Guard, or one of its precursor services, who were recognized for their heroism.  The Coast Guard chose Edgar Culbertson as the namesake of the 37th cutter.  Culbertson and two other Coast Guard sailors saw three teenage boys at the end of a long pier, on Lake Superior, when a storm had whipped up  waves.  They saw a wave wash one boy off the pier, and saw the other boys pinned by the extremity of the weather.  Culbertson and his comrades ventured out onto the pier to rescue the boys, and Culbertson himself was washed away.

References

Sentinel-class cutters
2020 ships
Ships of the United States Coast Guard
Ships built in Lockport, Louisiana